Henry Guy (16 June 1631 – 23 February 1710) was an English politician.

Early life
Guy, only son of Henry Guy by Elizabeth, daughter of Francis Wethered of Ashlyns, Great Berkhampstead, was born in that parish on 16 June 1631. The father died in 1640, the mother in 1690, aged 90, when she was buried in the chancel of Tring Church, and her son erected a monument to her memory.

Henry was admitted at the Inner Temple in November 1652, but adopted politics as a profession. He spent some time at Christ Church, Oxford, and was created M.A. in full convocation on 28 September 1663. He afterwards held an excise office in the north of England, and ingratiated himself with the electors of the borough of Hedon in Yorkshire, where he was admitted a free burgess on 2 August 1669.

Career
On 8 March 1670 Guy was elected Member of Parliament for Hedon, and continued to represent it until 1695. He again sat for it from 1702 till 1705, when his parliamentary career ended. In 1693 he commissioned Hedon Town Hall and presented it to the local council. In the House of Commons Guy spoke for the party of the Earl of Sunderland.

His first appointment about the court was to the post of cupbearer to the queen, but he was soon admitted among the boon companions of Charles II. On the resignation in 1675 of Colonel Silas Titus, he became Groom of the Bedchamber, but sold his office by November 1679 to Thomas Neale. In March 1679 he was appointed secretary to the Treasury, and the payments from the public funds passed through his hands until Christmas 1688. John Yonge Akerman edited, from a manuscript in the possession of William Selby Lowndes, for the Camden Society in 1851, as vol. lii. of their publications, details of secret service funds of Charles II and James II from 30 March 1679 to 25 December 1688; it was an account rendered by Guy some time after the accession of William III. In the Correspondence of Henry, Earl of Clarendon (ed. 1828) are particulars of sums paid to him for secret service money for one year, to 7 March 1688.

On the death of Henrietta Maria in 1669 Guy obtained a grant of the manor of Great Tring, and on the estate he built, from the design of Sir Christopher Wren, a house and gardens. This property he sold in 1702. In 1680 he acquired from Catherine of Braganza a lease for thirty years of the manor of Hemel Hempstead, and in 1686 some lands in Ireland were ordered by the king's letter to be transferred to him. In 1686 he was also residuary legatee to Thomas Naylor, a man of much wealth, who was buried in Westminster Abbey on 12 Nov. 1686. William III dined with him at Tring in June 1690.

In March 1691 he was made a commissioner of customs, but in the following June returned to the secretaryship of the treasury.  His displacement was talked of in February 1695, and when the charge of having accepted a bribe was brought home to him, he was forced to resign and was committed to the Tower (16 February).  In 1696 he guaranteed, with many other members of his party, a loan from the Dutch government of £300,000.

Guy died on 23 February 1710 aged 78. He left £500 a year and £40,000 in cash to William Pulteney, who succeeded him as MP for Hedon.

References

Attribution

1631 births
1710 deaths
Members of the Parliament of England for Hedon
18th-century English people
English MPs 1661–1679
English MPs 1679
English MPs 1680–1681
English MPs 1681
English MPs 1685–1687
English MPs 1689–1690
English MPs 1690–1695
English MPs 1702–1705